William Bunn Shattuc (June 11, 1841 – July 13, 1911) was a U.S. Representative from Ohio for three terms from 1897 to 1903.

Biography
William Shattuc was born in Hector, New York but Shattuc moved to Ohio in 1852 with his parents, who settled near Sandusky.

During the American Civil War, Shattuc enlisted in Company I, 2nd Ohio Cavalry, August 13, 1861, with a commission as a second lieutenant.

He mustered out February 21, 1863, as a first lieutenant.
He served as assistant and afterward general passenger agent of the Ohio and Mississippi Railway Company from 1865 to 1894 and served as member of the State senate in 1895.

Congress 
Shattuc was elected as a Republican to the Fifty-fifth, Fifty-sixth and Fifty-seventh Congresses (March 4, 1897 – March 3, 1903).

He served as chairman of the Committee on Immigration and Naturalization (Fifty-sixth and Fifty-seventh Congresses) but was not a candidate for renomination in 1902.

Death
He died in Madisonville, near Cincinnati, Ohio, July 13, 1911 and was interred in Spring Grove Cemetery, Cincinnati, Ohio.

References
 Retrieved on 2008-10-19

1841 births
1911 deaths
Politicians from Sandusky, Ohio
Politicians from Cincinnati
Union Army officers
Burials at Spring Grove Cemetery
Republican Party Ohio state senators
People of Ohio in the American Civil War
19th-century American politicians
Republican Party members of the United States House of Representatives from Ohio